In physics, the correspondence principle states that the behavior of systems described by the theory of quantum mechanics (or by the old quantum theory) reproduces classical physics in the limit of large quantum numbers. In other words, it says that for large orbits and for large energies, quantum calculations must agree with classical calculations.

The principle was formulated by Niels Bohr in 1920, though he had previously made use of it as early as 1913 in developing his model of the atom.

The term codifies the idea that a new theory should reproduce under some conditions the results of older well-established theories in those domains where the old theories work. This concept is somewhat different from the requirement of a formal limit under which the new theory reduces to the older, thanks to the existence of a deformation parameter.  

Classical quantities appear in quantum mechanics in the form of expected values of observables, and as such the Ehrenfest theorem (which predicts the time evolution of the expected values) lends support to the correspondence principle.

Quantum mechanics

The rules of quantum mechanics are highly successful in describing microscopic objects, atoms and elementary particles. But macroscopic systems, like springs and capacitors, are accurately described by classical theories like classical mechanics and classical electrodynamics. If quantum mechanics were to be applicable to macroscopic objects, there must be some limit in which quantum mechanics reduces to classical mechanics.  Bohr's correspondence principle demands that classical physics and quantum physics give the same answer when the systems become large. Arnold Sommerfeld referred to the principle as "Bohrs Zauberstab" (Bohr's magic wand) in 1921.

The conditions under which quantum and classical physics agree are referred to as the correspondence limit, or the classical limit. Bohr provided a rough prescription for the correspondence limit: it occurs when the quantum numbers describing the system are large. A more elaborated analysis of quantum-classical correspondence (QCC) in wavepacket spreading leads to the distinction between robust "restricted QCC" and fragile "detailed QCC". "Restricted QCC" refers to the first two moments of the probability distribution and is true even when the wave packets diffract, while "detailed QCC" requires smooth potentials which vary over scales much larger than the wavelength, which is what Bohr considered.

The post-1925 new quantum theory came in two different formulations. In matrix mechanics, the correspondence principle was built in and was used to construct the theory. In the Schrödinger approach classical behavior is not clear because the waves spread out as they move. Once the Schrödinger equation was given a probabilistic interpretation, Ehrenfest showed that Newton's laws hold on average: the quantum statistical expectation value of the position and momentum obey Newton's laws.

The correspondence principle is one of the tools available to physicists for selecting quantum theories corresponding to reality. The principles of quantum mechanics are broad: states of a physical system form a complex vector space and physical observables are identified with Hermitian operators that act on this Hilbert space. The correspondence principle limits the choices to those that reproduce classical mechanics in the correspondence limit.

Other scientific theories

The term "correspondence principle" is used in a more general sense to mean the reduction of a new scientific theory to an earlier scientific theory in appropriate circumstances. This requires that the new theory explain all the phenomena under circumstances for which the preceding theory was known to be valid, the "correspondence limit".

For example, 
Einstein's special relativity satisfies the correspondence principle, because it reduces to classical mechanics in the limit of velocities small compared to the speed of light (example below);
 General relativity reduces to Newtonian gravity in the limit of weak gravitational fields;
 Laplace's theory of celestial mechanics reduces to Kepler's when interplanetary interactions are ignored;
 Statistical mechanics reproduces thermodynamics when the number of particles is large;
 In biology, chromosome inheritance theory reproduces Mendel's laws of inheritance, in the domain that the inherited factors are protein coding genes.
 In mathematical economics, as formalized in Foundations of Economic Analysis (1947) by Paul Samuelson, the correspondence principle and other postulates imply testable predictions about how the equilibrium changes when parameters are changed in an economic system.

In order for there to be a correspondence, the earlier theory has to have a domain of validity—it must work under some conditions. Not all theories have a domain of validity. For example, there is no limit where Newton's mechanics reduces to Aristotle's mechanics because Aristotle's mechanics, although academically dominant for 18 centuries, does not have any domain of validity (on the other hand, it can sensibly be said that the falling of objects through the air ("natural motion") constitutes a domain of validity for a part of Aristotle's mechanics).

Examples

Bohr model

If an electron in an atom is moving on an orbit with period , classically the electromagnetic radiation will repeat itself every orbital period.

Bohr considered circular orbits. Classically, these orbits must decay to smaller circles when photons are emitted. The level spacing between circular orbits can be calculated with the correspondence formula.

It is possible to determine the energy levels by recursively stepping down orbit by orbit, but there is a shortcut.

The energy in terms of the angular momentum is then

This is as desired for equally spaced angular momenta.

This is how Bohr arrived at his model. Since only the level spacing is determined heuristically by the correspondence principle, one could always add a small fixed offset to the quantum number—  could just as well have been .

Bohr used his physical intuition to decide which quantities were best to quantize. It is a testimony to his skill that he was able to get so much from what is only the leading order approximation. A less heuristic treatment accounts for needed offsets in the ground state L2, cf. Wigner–Weyl transform.

One-dimensional potential 

Bohr's correspondence condition can be solved for the level energies in a general one-dimensional potential. Define a quantity     which is a function only of the energy, and has the property that

This is the analogue of the angular momentum in the case of the circular orbits. The orbits selected by the correspondence principle are the ones that obey    for  integer, since

Since this is equal to the inverse period at all times, the variable   increases steadily from 0 to 1 over one period.

The angle variable comes back to itself after 1 unit of increase, so the geometry of phase space in   coordinates is that of a half-cylinder, capped off at   = 0, which is the motionless orbit at the lowest value of the energy.

So   is equal to the area enclosed by the orbit in   coordinates too,

Multiperiodic motion: Bohr–Sommerfeld quantization 

Bohr's correspondence principle provided a way to find the semiclassical quantization rule for a one degree of freedom system. It was an argument for the old quantum condition mostly independent from the one developed by Wien and Einstein, which focused on adiabatic invariance. But both pointed to the same quantity, the action.

Bohr was reluctant to generalize the rule to systems with many degrees of freedom. This step was taken by Sommerfeld, who proposed the general quantization rule for an integrable system,

Each action variable is a separate integer, a separate quantum number.

This condition reproduces the circular orbit condition for two dimensional motion: let   be polar coordinates for a central potential. So the quantum condition for   reproduces Bohr's rule:

This allowed Sommerfeld to generalize Bohr's theory of circular orbits to elliptical orbits, showing that the energy levels are the same. He also found some general properties of quantum angular momentum which seemed paradoxical at the time. One of these results was that the z-component of the angular momentum, the classical inclination of an orbit relative to the z-axis, could only take on discrete values, a result which seemed to contradict rotational invariance. This was called space quantization for a while, but this term fell out of favor with the new quantum mechanics since no quantization of space is involved.

In modern quantum mechanics, the principle of superposition makes it clear that rotational invariance is not lost. It is possible to rotate objects with discrete orientations to produce superpositions of other discrete orientations, and this resolves the intuitive paradoxes of the Sommerfeld model.

The quantum harmonic oscillator

Here is a demonstration
of how large quantum numbers can give rise to classical (continuous) behavior.

Consider the one-dimensional quantum harmonic oscillator. Quantum mechanics tells us that the total (kinetic and potential) energy of the oscillator, has a set of discrete values,

where    is the angular frequency of the oscillator.

However, in a classical harmonic oscillator such as a lead ball attached to the end of a spring, we do not perceive any discreteness. Instead, the energy of such a macroscopic system appears to vary over a continuum of values. We can verify that our idea of macroscopic systems falls within the correspondence limit. The energy of the classical harmonic oscillator with amplitude ,  is

Thus, the quantum number has the value

If we apply typical "human-scale" values  = 1kg,    = 1 rad/s, and  = 1 m, then  ≈ 4.74×1033. This is a very large number, so the system is indeed in the correspondence limit.

It is simple to see why we perceive a continuum of energy in this limit.  With    = 1  rad/s, the difference between each energy level is  ≈  1.05 × 10−34J, well below what we normally resolve for macroscopic systems. One then describes this system through an emergent classical limit.

Relativistic kinetic energy

Here we show that the expression of kinetic energy from special relativity becomes arbitrarily close to the classical expression, for speeds that are much slower than the speed of light,  .

Albert Einstein's   mass-energy equation

When the velocity   vanishes, the energy expressed above is not zero, and represents the rest energy,

When the body is in motion relative to the observer, the total energy exceeds the rest energy by an amount that is, by definition, the kinetic energy,

which is the Newtonian expression for kinetic energy.

See also
 Quantum decoherence
 Classical limit
 Classical probability density
 Leggett–Garg inequality

References

Quantum mechanics
Theory of relativity
Philosophy of physics
Theoretical physics
Principles
Metatheory